Basic Education High School No. 2 Sanchaung (abbreviated to အ.ထ.က. (၂) စမ်းချောင်း; formerly, St. Philomena's High School; commonly known as Sanchaung 2 High School), located in Pyay Road, Sanchaung township, is a public high school in Yangon. The mostly-girls school offers classes from kindergarten to Tenth Standard (or Grade 1 through Grade 11 in the new nomenclature).

The school's main colonial era building, in its 13-acre (5.26 hectare) campus, is a landmark protected by the city, and is listed on the Yangon City Heritage List.

The school produced the top ranked students in 2009, 2010, 2013, 2014  at national college matriculation examinations.

Alumni 

Daw Swe Zin Htaik

References

External links
 Sanchaung (2) Alumnae Network
 https://web.archive.org/web/20140109093137/http://www.finitesite.com/sanchaung2/join.html
 https://web.archive.org/web/20140109065824/http://www.finitesite.com/sanchaung2/enter.html

Girls' schools in Yangon
High schools in Yangon